Tenderoni is a trademarked stovetop macaroni product, now no longer produced, and the slang term derived from it.

Tenderoni may also refer to:
"Tenderoni" (Chromeo song), a 2007 song by the Canadian band Chromeo
"Tenderoni" (Kele Okereke song), a 2010 song by UK performer Kele